Jovin Hervas Bedic (born June 8, 1990) is a Filipino professional footballer who plays as a forward for Philippines Football League club Kaya-Iloilo and the Philippines national team.

Early life
Bedic was born in Barotac Nuevo, Iloilo—a town nicknamed the "Football Capital of the Philippines". His father was a football instructor, while his older brother also played the sport. He began playing football in the second grade. 

Bedic attended West Negros University in Bacolod to study information technology and was part of the school's varsity team. However, he later dropped out.

Club career

Pachanga
Bedic was invited by coach Nonoy Fegidero to join Pachanga for the 2011 United Football League (UFL) Cup. He scored a goal in each of the three group matches as Pachanga topped their group with two wins and a draw. Their campaign ended after losing to Global in the quarter-finals.

Pachanga were then admitted to the United Football League Division 2 for the 2012 season. On June 16, Bedic scored a brace in the first half of their 4–0 victory over Agila, winning the league title with one match to spare.

Stallion
Bedic played for Stallion for around two months.

Kaya
Bedic joined Kaya in 2013. During the 2018 Copa Paulino Alcantara final, Kaya and Davao Aguilas were at a scoreless draw by the end of regulation time.  At the 119th minute, Bedic scored the match-winning goal to give Kaya the victory, winning the inaugural tournament.

In Kaya's first match of the 2019 AFC Cup group stage, Bedic scored the first goal in a 1–1 draw against Lao Toyota on February 27. He then scored the second goal in a 5–0 win over defending ASEAN Zonal champions Home United on March 13. His 91st-minute penalty was Kaya's only goal in a 2–1 loss to PSM Makassar on April 17. However, Kaya failed to advance from the group stage.

During Kaya's debut campaign in the AFC Champions League, Bedic scored in their 2–1 group stage loss to defending champions Ulsan Hyundai on July 5, 2021. Later that year, he won the 2021 Copa Paulino Alcantara Golden Ball by leading Kaya to their second title. He scored three goals in the tournament.

International career

Philippines
Bedic made his senior debut for the Philippines coming on as substitute in a friendly goalless draw against Malaysia, played at the Cebu City Sports Center on April 27, 2014. He made his second appearance for the national team in a friendly match against Kyrgyzstan on September 6, 2016.

Bedic was named in the 21-man squad for the 2018 Bangabandhu Cup. In the Philippines' first group match of the tournament against Laos on October 3, Bedic was fouled in the penalty area; he then took the penalty kick and scored his first international goal in a 3–1 victory. The Philippines went on to top Group B undefeated, but lost to Tajikistan in the semi-finals.

Bedic was included in the Philippines' 23-man squad for the 2018 AFF Championship. In the Philippines' third group match against defending champions Thailand, he came on as a 78th-minute substitute for Stephan Palla. Within three minutes, he scored the equalizing goal to ensure a 1–1 draw. However, in the semi-finals, Philippines were defeated by eventual champions Vietnam on 4–2 aggregate.

Bedic was named in the Philippines' squad for the 2019 AFC Asian Cup—the first time the national team has qualified for the international tournament. He was not able to play in the tournament as the Philippines were eliminated after losing all their group stage games.

Philippines U23
Bedic was named as one of the over-aged players for the Philippines under-23 team at the 31st Southeast Asian Games, which was held in Vietnam. Bedic scored his first goal for Philippines U23 in a 4-0 win against Timor-Leste

International goals
Scores and results list the Philippines' goal tally first.

Career Statistics

Club

Honors
Kaya–Iloilo
 Copa Paulino Alcantara: 2018, 2021; runner-up: 2019
 United Football League Cup third place: 2016

Individual
 Copa Paulino Alcantara Golden Ball: 2021

References

1990 births
Living people
Filipino footballers
Footballers from Iloilo
Stallion Laguna F.C. players
Kaya F.C. players
Philippines international footballers
Association football forwards
Association football wingers
2019 AFC Asian Cup players
Competitors at the 2021 Southeast Asian Games
Southeast Asian Games competitors for the Philippines